Phalaris angusta is a species of grass known by the common names timothy canarygrass and narrow canarygrass. It is native to the Americas, where it is most common in Chile and Argentina and can be found in northern South America and sections of the southwestern and southeastern United States. It is also known as an introduced species in Australia. It grows in grassland, prairie, marshland, and other habitat.

Description
Phalaris angusta is an annual grass reaching as much as 2.5 meters tall. The inflorescence is a narrow cylindrical spike of rough-haired, pointed spikelets.

Toxicity
Like some other Phalaris species, this grass is toxic to livestock. Calves that eat the grass develop neurological signs such as tremors and convulsions and gross examination of their brain tissue reveals large blue-green lesions. Some cattle and sheep die suddenly after grazing in pastures of the grass, while some linger with signs of neurological compromise.

References

External links
Jepson Manual Treatment
USDA Plants Profile
Grass Manual Treatment

angusta
Grasses of Argentina
Flora of Argentina
Flora of Chile
Flora of the Southwestern United States
Flora of the Sierra Nevada (United States)
Flora of California
Native grasses of California
Native grasses of Texas
Grasses of Alabama
Flora of the Southeastern United States
Flora of northern South America
Flora without expected TNC conservation status